BHF-177 is a compound used in scientific research which acts as a positive allosteric modulator at the GABAB receptor. It was shown to reduce self-administration of nicotine in animal studies.

References 

Pyrimidines
Trifluoromethyl compounds
GABAB receptor positive allosteric modulators